State v. Leidholm, Supreme Court of North Dakota, 334 N.W.2d 811 (1983), is a criminal law case distinguishing the subjective and objective standard of reasonableness in a case where a battered woman  used self-protection as a defense. Janice Leidholm had killed her husband near Washburn, North Dakota and claimed self defense. The case clarifies between the defenses of justification and excuse.

References

North Dakota state case law
1983 in North Dakota
1983 in United States case law
Domestic violence in the United States
Self-defense
McLean County, North Dakota
Mariticides